Issam Jemâa (born 28 January 1984 in Gabès) is a Tunisian former professional footballer who played as a striker. He started his footballing career for Espérance Sportive de Tunis, and was later signed by French side Lens. A Tunisia international since 2005, he is the all-time leading scorer of the Tunisia national team.

International career
Jemâa was called up to the 2006 World Cup, but was later forced out from the squad due to injury. He was also called up to the Tunisia national team for the 2008 Africa Cup of Nations in Ghana and the 2010 Africa Cup of Nations in Angola.

Career statistics

Club

International goals

Scores and results list Tunisia's goal tally first, score column indicates score after each Jemâa goal.

Honours
Lens
UEFA Intertoto Cup: 2005

References

External links
Career history, stats and pictures of Issam Jemâa

1984 births
Living people
Tunisian footballers
Tunisia international footballers
Tunisian expatriate footballers
Association football forwards
Ligue 1 players
Ligue 2 players
UAE First Division League players
RC Lens players
Stade Malherbe Caen players
AJ Auxerre players
Stade Brestois 29 players
Espérance Sportive de Tunis players
Kuwait SC players
Al-Sailiya SC players
Dubai CSC players
Qatar Stars League players
2005 FIFA Confederations Cup players
2008 Africa Cup of Nations players
2010 Africa Cup of Nations players
2012 Africa Cup of Nations players
2013 Africa Cup of Nations players
Expatriate footballers in France
Expatriate footballers in Kuwait
Expatriate footballers in Qatar
AFC Cup winning players
Tunisian expatriate sportspeople in Kuwait
Kuwait Premier League players